Graham Barry Stevenson (16 December 1955 – 21 January 2014) was an English cricketer, who played in two Test matches and four One Day Internationals from 1980 to 1981.

His county cricket career was spent mainly with Yorkshire and, latterly, Northamptonshire.

Life and career
Stevenson was born in 1955 in Ackworth, West Riding of Yorkshire. He was a right-armed fast bowler, who also found occasional success as a right-handed lower order batsman, and very occasional wicket-keeper; playing for Yorkshire from 1973 to 1986, and for Northamptonshire in 1987. Stevenson took 488 first-class wickets in 188 games at an average of 28.84, with an additional 307 wickets in the one day game. He scored two first-class centuries, with a top score of 115 not out. With that innings, Stevenson became only the eighth No. 11 to make a first-class hundred, in a partnership of 149 with Geoffrey Boycott against Warwickshire at Edgbaston in 1982. That partnership remains Yorkshire's all-time record for the tenth wicket.

Stevenson made all his international appearances on tour with England.  He travelled to Australia and India in 1979–80, and to the West Indies in 1980–81. He made his One Day International debut in Australia, in the World Series Cup, taking four wickets and scoring 28 not out in a winning cause.

Stevenson died of complications of a stroke on 21 January 2014. He was 58.

References

External links
 

1955 births
2014 deaths
English cricketers
England Test cricketers
England One Day International cricketers
Northamptonshire cricketers
Yorkshire cricketers
People from Ackworth, West Yorkshire
Marylebone Cricket Club cricketers
Sportspeople from Yorkshire
Young England cricketers